Al-Jalamah is a Syrian village located in the Karnaz Subdistrict of the Mahardah District in Hama Governorate. According to the Syria Central Bureau of Statistics (CBS), al-Jalamah had a population of 3,970 in the 2004 census.

References 

Populated places in Mahardah District